Virginia civil procedure is the body of law that sets out the rules and standards that Virginia courts follow when adjudicating civil lawsuits (as opposed to procedures in criminal law matters). Professor W. Hamilton Bryson is the preeminent master and legal scholar on Virginia Civil Procedure. Many commentators particularly equate him with the "scholars and lords chancellors of old."

The Virginia Court System
The Virginia court consists of four levels of courts: the Supreme Court of Virginia, the Court of Appeals of Virginia, the Virginia Circuit Court, and the Virginia General District Court. In addition, magistrates serve as judicial officers with authority to issue various types of processes.

Personal Jurisdiction in Virginia
For a court in Virginia to have personal jurisdiction over a defendant, Virginia statutory requirements must be met and federal Constitutional limits must be complied with.

Virginia statutory requirements for personal jurisdiction
Virginia statutes allow for in personam jurisdiction over defendants who (1) reside in Virginia, (2) are served with process in Virginia, or (3) whose acts trigger Virginia's Long Arm Statute.

Constitutional limits on personal jurisdiction
See Constitutional limits on personal jurisdiction.

Subject Matter Jurisdiction in Virginia
For a court in Virginia to have subject matter jurisdiction, Virginia statutory requirements must be met and federal Constitutional limits must be complied with.

Virginia General District Court
See Jurisdiction of Virginia General District Courts.

Virginia Circuit Court
See Jurisdiction of Virginia Circuit Courts.

Court of Appeals of Virginia
See Jurisdiction of the Virginia Supreme Court.

Supreme Court of Virginia
See Jurisdiction of the Virginia Supreme Court.

Venue in Virginia
In terms of venue, where personal jurisdiction lies in multiple districts, the appropriate venue for the case to be heard is set forth by Virginia statutes, which divides possible venues as "Category A" (preferred) and "Category B" (permissible), and requires that Category B venue may only be used where no Category A venue is available. For example, in a dispute over the ownership of land, Category A venue lies where the land is located. Category B venue generally lies where the defendant resides or has a registered office or registered agent, or where some part of the action arose. If there are multiple parties, and any party requires Category A venue, then that venue will suffice for all parties; and if no party requires Category A venue, then any place where Category B venue lies as to one party will suffice as to all parties. In any case, if venue is inappropriate, then the objection to venue must be made within 21 days of service of process, and such objection must state why venue is improper, and where proper venue lies.

Service of Process in Virginia
See Service of process in Virginia.

Alternative Dispute Resolution in Virginia
Several kinds of alternative dispute resolution mechanisms are available in Virginia, including what is known as a "summary jury trial". Virginia has enacted a form of the Uniform Arbitration Act.

Default
If a defendant fails to file a responsive pleading within 21 days from service or after decision on preliminary motions, the defendant will be deemed to be "in default." That defendant is also deemed to have waived his right to a jury trial. In order for a plaintiff to obtain a default judgment, he must apply to the trial court for entry of such a judgment. Whether a hearing on damages is subsequently held depends largely on whether damages are liquidated or unliquidated. If the defendant learns of the hearing before it is held, he may attend, object to a plaintiff's evidence, cross-examine plaintiff's witnesses, offer evidence on damages, participate in jury selection (if applicable), submit jury instructions on damages, and make oral arguments on damages.

References

The Code of Virginia

See also
Judiciary of Virginia
Virginia General District Court
Virginia Circuit Court
Court of Appeals of Virginia
Supreme Court of Virginia
Law of Virginia
Collection of judgments in Virginia

Virginia law
United States civil procedure
Codes of civil procedure